Matthew Hansen is a Canadian screenwriter, author and editor. A former competitive cyclist, Hansen lives in Toronto, Ontario. He began his publishing career as a cycling journalist. Following that, Hansen worked as an editor for Dreamwave Productions, publishers of several comic titles including The Transformers, before moving on to become the Editor in Chief of Marvel Comics/Dabel Brothers Productions

Hansen adapted R.A. Salvatore's novel The Highwayman through Marvel Comics. Hansen also adapted Ted Dekker's Circle Trilogy of novels into graphic novels.

Hansen wrote the film Zoom, which premiered at the Toronto International Film Festival in 2015. In 2016, Hansen was nominated for a Canadian Screen Award for Zoom, for Best Original Screenplay.

References
Matt Hansen TIFF's Most Eccentric Screenwriter
Zoom at TIFF 2015

Matthew Hansen and John Waters at the Toronto International Film Festival

Canadian comics writers
Living people
Canadian male cyclists
Cycling journalists
Cyclists from Ontario
Journalists from Toronto
Sportspeople from Toronto
Writers from Toronto
Canadian male journalists
Year of birth missing (living people)